LP-12 is a drug which acts as a potent agonist at the 5HT7 serotonin receptor, with very high selectivity over other tested receptor subtypes such as the serotonin 5-HT1A and 5-HT2A, and the dopamine D2 receptor. It has been used to research the involvement of the 5-HT7 receptor in as yet poorly understood processes such as allodynia and hyperalgesia.

See also
 AS-19
 E-55888
 LP-44
 LP-211

References

5-HT7 agonists
1-Aminotetralins
Phenylpiperazines